Iaconi is an Italian surname. Notable people with the surname include:

Frank Iaconi ( 1895–1956), American mobster
Ivo Iaconi (born 1956), Italian footballer and manager

See also
Iacone

Italian-language surnames